Brian Gene Glasgow (born June 6, 1961) is a former American football tight end who played for the Chicago Bears of the National Football League (NFL). He played college football at Northern Illinois University.

References 

1961 births
Living people
American football tight ends
Northern Illinois Huskies football players
Chicago Blitz players
Chicago Bears players